Animated television series first aired in the 1960s.

1960

1961

1962

1963

1964

1965

1966

1967

1968

1969

References

1960s
Animated